Joseph Goodman is a role-playing game designer and the owner of Goodman Games. He is best known for the d20 adventure series, Dungeon Crawl Classics and the Dungeon Crawl Classics Role Playing Game.

Career
Joseph Goodman has been a gaming professional since 1994, when he self-published The Dark Library, a fanzine for his interest in miniatures games such as Warhammer 40k.  Heartbreaker Hobbies & Games later hired him as editor-in-chief of their own magazine, Forge: The Magazine of Miniature Gaming.  Goodman then started his own game publishing company, Goodman Games, with his first RPG being Broncosaurus Rex. Despite success with Broncosaurus Rex and then moving to fantasy dungeon crawls, Goodman did not bring any game designers in house and continued to work with creators on a freelance basis. With Dungeon Crawl Classics, Goodman was trying to publish the sort of intelligent dungeon crawl adventures that he was interested in playing, and he wanted to serve the large part of the demographic market made up of older gamers. In 2004, Goodman also developed the Dragonmech setting, which he released under White Wolf's Swords & Sorcery label.

Works
Writing credits include:
Dungeon Crawl Classics Role Playing Game (2012), Creator and Writer
Steam Warriors (Dragonmech) (2005), Author
Aerial Adventure Guide: Sky Captain's Handbook (2004), Contributing Writer
Complete Guide to Vampires (2004), Additional Writing
Dragonmech (2004), Creator and Writer
The Shardsfall Quest (Dragonmech) (2004), Author
Dungeon Crawl Classics #3: The Mysterious Tower (d20 System)(2003), Author
Monsters of the Endless Dark (Wanderers Guild) (2003), Additional Writing
Cretasus Adventure Guide (Dinosaur Planet: Broncosaurus Rex) (2002), Author
Metabarons #1 Path of the Warrior (Metabarons, The) (2002), West End Games, Author
Dinosaur Planet: Broncosaurus Rex Core Rulebook (2001) - Creator and Writer

References

Role-playing game designers
Living people
Year of birth missing (living people)